Thomas William Allen (10 September 1914 – 27 June 1965) was an Australian rules footballer who played with South Melbourne in the Victorian Football League (VFL), and with Port Melbourne in the Victorian Football Association (VFA).

Family
The son of William Allen, and Sarah Allen, née Archer, Thomas William Allen was born on 10 September 1914. He was the older brother of George Allen who also played for South Melbourne.  He died in South Melbourne on 27 June 1965.

Footnotes

References
 Photograph of troops of the 20th Field Company, Collection of the Australian War Memorial.
 World War Two Nominal Roll: Sapper Thomas William Allen (VX70816), Department of Veterans' Affairs.

External links

 The VFA Project: Allen, Tommy.
 Boyles Football Photos: Tommy Allen.

1914 births
1965 deaths
Australian rules footballers from Melbourne
Sydney Swans players
People from South Melbourne